Nazime Sultan ("clouds" or "poetic"; 25 February 1867 – 9 November 1947) was an Ottoman princess, the daughter of Ottoman Sultan Abdulaziz and Hayranidil Kadın.

Early life
Nazime Sultan was born on 25 February 1867 in at the Dolmabahçe Palace. Her father was Sultan Abdulaziz, and her mother was Hayranidil Kadın. She was the second daughter of her father and the first child of her mother. She was the elder full sister of the future Caliph Abdulmejid II. She was the granddaughter of Mahmud II and Pertevniyal Sultan.

Her father, Abdulaziz was deposed by his ministers on 30 May 1876, his nephew Murad V became the Sultan. He was transferred to Feriye Palace the next day. Her mother, and other women of Abdulaziz's entourage didn't want to leave the Dolmabahçe Palace. So they were grabbed by hand and were send out to the Feriye Palace. In the process, they were searched from head to toe and everything of value was taken from them. On 4 June 1876, Abdulaziz died under mysterious circumstances.

Nazime Sultan, a ten-year-old girl, continued to live in the Feriye Palace with her mother and eight-year-old brother. Recounting the event in an interview to Adil Sulh Bey years later, Nazime said:

Marriage
In 1889 Sultan Abdul Hamid II arranged her trousseaux and marriage together with her two sisters, princesses Saliha Sultan and Esma Sultan, as well his own daughter Zekiye Sultan. She married Ali Halid Pasha, the son of Ibrahim Derviş Pasha on 20 April 1889 in the Yıldız Palace. 

The couple were given a palace located at Kuruçeşme, known as Nazime Sultan Palace, as their residence. Here she had performers of religious music. She did not have any children.

Philanthropy
Müdafaa-i Milliye Hanımlar Cemiyeti (Woman’s Chapter of the Society of National Defense), an organization was established in September 1912 and went to Istanbul to take care of people wounded in the Balkan Wars. Upon its establishment in February 1913, the Women's Chapter of the Society of National Defense organized two meetings at the Darülfünun Lecture Hall under the auspices of Nazime and Nimet Mukhtar, daughter of Khedive Isma'il Pasha, which were led by Selma Hanım, sister of Ahmed Rıza Bey, a prominent CUP member and the head of the parliament.

In 1912, the "Hilal-i Ahmer Centre for Women" was organized within the "Ottoman Hilal-i Ahmer Association", a foundation established in 1877 to provide medical care in Istanbul and surrounding communities. In May 1915, during the Gallipoli Campaign, as the member of this organization, Nazime donated 50 Turkish liras to a hospital to purchase beds and other goods for 
soldiers.

Exile
Following the imperial family was sent to exile in 1924, Nazime and her husband settled in Jounieh, Lebanon. Here the two lived in a large mansion surrounded by garden.

When Dürrüşehvar Sultan married Prince Azam Jah, the eldest son and heir of the last Nizam of Hyderabad State, Osman Ali Khan, Asif Jah VII in 1932, Nazime Sultan gave her a diamond tiara. To Neslişah Sultan, she offered a beautiful bracelet embossed with three diamonds, when she married Prince Mohamed Abdel Moneim, son of Egypt's last khedive Abbas Hilmi II in 1940.

According to Neslişah Sultan, she was tiny, rather ugly, with large lips like her father's, but quite impressive.

Death

Nazime died on 9 November 1947 in Jounieh, Lebanon. She was the last surviving child of Abdulaziz. She was buried in the cemetery of the Sulaymaniyya Takiyya, Damascus, Syria. Her husband outlived by one year, and died in 1948 in Mecca, Saudi Arabia.

Honours

 Order of the House of Osman
 Order of the Medjidie, Jeweled
 Order of Charity, 1st Class

Ancestry

See also
 List of Ottoman princesses

References

Sources

 
 

1866 births
1947 deaths
Royalty from Istanbul
19th-century Ottoman princesses
20th-century Ottoman princesses
Burials in the cemetery of the Sulaymaniyya Takiyya